Nord-Varanger is a former municipality in Finnmark county in Norway.  The  municipality existed from 1894 until its dissolution in 1964.  It was located in the present-day Vadsø Municipality on the southern half of the Varanger Peninsula, east of the Jakobselva river, along the Varangerfjorden.  The administrative centre of the municipality was in the town of Vadsø.

Name
The name Nord-Varanger refers to the northern coast of the Varangerfjorden, (Old Norse: Ver(j)angr).  The first part is ver meaning "fishing village" and the last part is angr which means "fjord". It was first probably used for the narrow fjord on the inside of Angsnes which now is called "Meskfjorden" and leads into Varangerbotn.

History
The kjøpstad (market town) of Vadsø was established as a municipality on 1 January 1838 (see formannskapsdistrikt).  Because of the low population in the rural area around the town, the municipality originally included the rural area around it.  That rural area was known as the Vadsø landsogn.  On 1 January 1894, Vadsø landsogn was separated from the town of Vadsø and became the new municipality called Nord-Varanger.  Nord-Varanger had an initial population of 1,296.  During the 1960s, there were many municipal mergers across Norway due to the work of the Schei Committee. On 1 January 1964, Nord-Varanger (population: 1,587) was merged with the town of Vadsø once again to create the present-day Vadsø Municipality.

Government

Municipal council
The municipal council  of Nord-Varanger was made up of 17 representatives that were elected to four year terms.  The party breakdown of the final municipal council was as follows:

See also
List of former municipalities of Norway

References

External links

Vadsø
Former municipalities of Norway
1894 establishments in Norway
1964 disestablishments in Norway